Jalan Temoh (Perak state route A116) is a major road in Perak, Malaysia.

List of junctions

Temoh